{|

{{Infobox ship image
|Ship image = File:Girona shipwreck (display painting).jpg|Girona shipwreck (display painting)
|Ship image size = 300px
|Ship caption = Wreck of the Girona (Ulster Museum Exhibit Painting)}}
|}La Girona was a galleass of the 1588 Spanish Armada that foundered and sank off Lacada Point, County Antrim, on the night of 26 October 1588, after making its way eastward along the north coast of Ulster. The wreck is noteworthy for the great loss of life that resulted and the treasures recovered.

 Introduction La Girona (/lɑː xɪˈrɔːnɑː/) was named after the Girones family, who at the time had just become Dukes of Osuna and viceroys of Naples (not after Girona, the Catalan name of the city and province of Gerona). Its captain was Hugo de Moncada y Gralla, knight of the Order of Malta.

 Shipwreck La Girona had anchored with a damaged rudder in Killybegs Harbour in the south-west of Tír Chonaill, a Gaelic túath that covered most of the then newly established County Donegal in the west of Ulster. With the assistance of an Irish chieftain, MacSweeney Bannagh, she was repaired and set sail for the Kingdom of Scotland on 28 October, with 1,300 men on board, including Alonso Martínez de Leyva, knight and trece of the Order of Santiago.

After Lough Foyle was cleared, a gale struck and La Girona was driven on to Lacada Point and the "Spanish Rocks'" (as they were known, thereafter) near Ballintoy in The Route, a territory on the north coast of County Antrim in the north-east of Ulster, on the night of 26 October 1588. Of the estimated 1,300 souls on board, there were nine survivors. 260 bodies washed ashore and were buried in a common grave at the local churchyard.

The survivors were sent on to Scotland by the local clan leader, Sorley Boy MacDonnell of Dunluce Castle, which was situated just to the west on the Giant's Causeway cliffs overlooking the coast. From there, MacDonnell is also believed to have conducted the first clandestine salvage efforts on the shipwreck.

 Salvage 
Between 1967 and April 1968, off the coast of Portballintrae (Port-na-Spaniagh Bay), a team consisting of local diver and historian John MacLennan, alongside a team of Belgian divers (including Robert Sténuit, the world's first aquanaut)located the remains of the wreck and brought up the greatest find of Spanish Armada treasure salvaged up until that time. The underwater site was designated under the Protection of Wrecks Act on 22 April 1993.

Commemoration

The wrecking of La Girona was officially commemorated with a period illustration on the reverse side of sterling banknotes formerly issued by the First Trust Bank in Northern Ireland.

Ulster Museum Exhibit, Belfast"Treasures from the Girona".
Gold and silver coins, jewelry, armaments, and utilitarian objects from the Spanish galleass, Girona'', are on permanent display at the Ulster Museum (part of the National Museums of Northern Ireland) in Stranmillis in Belfast.

See also
 Spanish Armada in Ireland
 List of Ships of the Spanish Armada

References

External links

Culture Northern Ireland
Annual Report of the Advisory Committee on Historic Wrecks, 2006
Girona Tribute
Gold of the Girona
Photograph of Lacada Point where the Girona foundered
Girona's shipwreck(In Catalan) Revista de Girona 214/2002

Individual sailing vessels
Protected Wrecks of Northern Ireland
16th-century maritime incidents
Age of Sail ships of Spain
Maritime incidents in Ireland
Spanish Armada
1588 in Ireland